Nancy-Lorraine might refer to:

EF Nancy-Lorraine, French football club active between 1943 and 1944
AS Nancy-Lorraine, French football club founded in 1967
Nancy-Lorraine, a minor planet